The FIBA Under-19 Women's Basketball World Cup (formerly FIBA Under-19 World Championship for Women) is the women's international under-19 basketball championship organised by FIBA. From its inauguration in 1985, until 2005, it was held every four years. Since 2005, it has been held biennially.

Summaries

Medal table

Tournament awards

Most recent award winners (2021)

Participation details

Debut of national teams

Ranking of teams by number of appearances

Overall win–loss record 1985-2021
In bold, teams qualified for the 2023 edition.

See also
FIBA Under-17 Women's Basketball World Cup
FIBA Under-17 Basketball World Cup
FIBA Under-19 Basketball World Cup

References

 
Under
Recurring sporting events established in 1985
Women's basketball competitions between national teams
Under-19 basketball competitions between national teams
World youth sports competitions
World championships in basketball